The BBC Polish Section was one of the foreign-language services of the BBC World Service. It existed between 1939 and 2005.

History
A decision to establish the BBC Polish Section was made on 3 September 1939, after Great Britain declared war on Germany. First programme was broadcast on 7 September 1939.

Programmes consisted of news, press reviews, commentaries, reports and interviews, and were also used for transmitting coded messages and orders to the Polish Underground using prearranged selection of songs and code phrases.

After V-E Day, a decision was made to continue broadcasting in Polish. Like other broadcasts from behind the Iron Curtain, BBC Polish-language programmes were jammed and, in the 1950s, listeners on occasion would be persecuted as enemies of the people. Jamming stopped in the 1970s but was reintroduced in 1981 as the authorities clamped down on political freedom (see martial law in Poland). Jamming finally ended in 1988. During the post-war period, while still concentrating on impartial and uncensored news, programming was expanded to culture, technology, social matters, British life and daily English language lessons.

In 1996, the office in Warsaw was opened.

On 25 October 2005 it was announced that 10 foreign-language services, including Polish, will be closed to free resources needed to start a new Arabic-language television service. The last broadcast in Polish took place on 23 December 2005.

Key personnel

Heads of Polish Section
 Robin Campbell (1939–?)
 Michael Winch (?–1942)
 Gregory MacDonald (1942–1945)
 Evelyn Zasio (1945–1953)
 Józef Zarański (1953–1960)
 Stanisław Faecher (1960–1966)
 Zbigniew Błażyński (1966–1973)
 Jan Krok-Paszkowski (1973–1980)
 Krzysztof Pszenicki (1980–1988)
 Eugeniusz Smolar (1988–1998)
 Marek Cajzner (1998–2005)

Heads of Warsaw Office
 Robert Kozak
 Leszek Jarosz

External links
 History of the BBC Polish Section (Polish)
 50 years of the BBC Polish Section (Polish)
 This Is London: The Wartime Story of the BBC Polish Section

1939 establishments in the United Kingdom
2005 disestablishments in the United Kingdom
Polish Srction
Radio stations established in 1939
Radio stations disestablished in 2005
Poland–United Kingdom relations